Seminole High School is a public high school located in Seminole, Oklahoma, operated by Seminole Public Schools.

As of the 2006–07 school year, the school had an enrollment of 482 students and 30.6 classroom teachers (on a FTE basis), for a student–teacher ratio of 15.8.

In 2015, students were moved out of the high school due to safety concerns with the building that was originally built in 1930. In 2017, Seminole voters approved construction of a brand new high school to be built on the northwest side of the city. In January 2020, at the beginning of the second semester of the 2019–2020 school year, the students were moved out of the temporary building with the new facility having been completed.

Notable alumni
 Edmond Harjo (Seminole, 1917–2014), Seminole Nation of Oklahoma Code Talker during World War II, recipient of the Congressional Gold Medal
Troy Smith (1922-2009), founder of Sonic Drive-In
 Heather Wahlquist, actress
 William C. Wantland, Bishop of the Episcopal Diocese of Eau Claire
 Mary Jo Watson (Seminole) art historian and director emeritus of the University of Oklahoma's Art and Art History
 Don E. Schultz, considered the "father of Integrated Marketing Communications"

References

External links
Seminole High School

Public high schools in Oklahoma
Schools in Seminole County, Oklahoma